Big Brother VIP – Fans' Club (often shortened to Fans' Club) is a spinoff of the Albanian reality series Big Brother VIP, and is the Celebrity version of Big Brother – Fans' Club. The show premiered on 17 October 2021 on Top Channel. Big Brother VIP – Fans' Club was announced on September 2021 and has received its own title card and promotional videos. Throughout its first season a total of 19 episodes aired and concluded on 15 February 2022. The series was renewed for a second season and began airing on 8 January 2023. The first season was hosted by Dojna Mema. Mema did not return for season 2, and Megi Pojani took over as presenter. Iva Tiço was on the first season, as the Opinionist. Housemate from the first season of Big Brother VIP, Ardit Cuni was the Opinionist for the second season of the show, replacing Tiço.

The show broadcast every Sunday at 12:15 pm. The series follows the same format as Big Brother – Fans' Club which features debates and conversations about the latest goings inside and outside the house with a studio audience and celebrity panel, and with the first eliminated housemate who are usually invited to the studio after leaving.

Series overview

Episodes

Season 1 (2021-2022)

Season 2 (2023)

References

External links

2020s Albanian television series
2021 Albanian television series debuts
2021 Albanian television seasons
2022 Albanian television seasons
2023 Albanian television seasons
Big Brother (Albanian TV series)
Television shows set in Albania
Television shows filmed in Albania
Reality television spin-offs
Top Channel original programming